Leif Høegh (21 April 1896 - 23 May 1974) was a Norwegian shipowner. He founded the international shipping company known as Leif Höegh & Co in 1927.

Biography
Høegh was born in Kristiania (now Oslo), Norway. He was the son of Nils Vogt Petersen (1852-1927) and Elise Olsen (1864-1952)
He grew up in the neighborhood of Frogner  where his father was  employed by Westye Egeberg & Co. He graduated from the University of Kristiania (now University of Oslo) in 1916. In 1919, Høegh was employed by Wilh. Wilhelmsen as agent for the shipping line between New York City and South America.

Høegh ordered his first ship in 1927 and developed an enterprise with a leading position in the global maritime transportation sector.
At the time of the Norwegian invasion by Nazi Germany on April 9, 1940, the entire Høegh fleet was outside  German-controlled area. German officials  order all Norwegian merchant ships sail to a neutral or German-controlled port. 
With his failure to comply, Høegh was sent to Bredtveit Prison. Subsequently released, Høegh fled from Norway during the later phase of World War II.

He later represented Norwegian maritime interests with the United Maritime Authority with headquarters in London and Washington, DC.
He was an attendee of all Bilderberg Group (Bilderberg-gruppen) meetings between 1954 and 1974 (except in 1955)  and was a member of the Steering Committee of the Bilderberg Group.

In 1966, his eldest son Ove Dines Høegh took his place in the board of directors and in 1974, his younger son Morten Westye Høegh  became a board member.

Honors
Order of St. Olav 
Order of the Dannebrog
Order of Vasa 
Order of the White Rose of Finland 
Legion of Honour

References

Related reading
Bakka, Dag (1997) Höegh: Shipping through Cycles: Leif Höegh & Co, 1927-1997 (Oslo: Leif Höegh & Co)

External links
Høegh website

1896 births
1974 deaths
Businesspeople from Oslo in shipping
University of Oslo alumni
Norwegian company founders
Bredtveit concentration camp survivors
Members of the Steering Committee of the Bilderberg Group
Recipients of the Cross of Honour of the Order of the Dannebrog
Recipients of the Order of Vasa
Order of the White Rose of Finland
Recipients of the Legion of Honour
Recipients of the St. Olav's Medal